"They Dance Alone (Cueca Solo)" is a protest song composed by English musician Sting and published first on his 1987 album ...Nothing Like the Sun; the song was the fifth and final single released from the album. The song is a metaphor referring to mourning Chilean women (arpilleristas) who dance the Cueca, the national dance of Chile, alone with photographs of their disappeared loved ones in their hands.

Sting was accompanied by Eric Clapton, Fareed Haque and Mark Knopfler on guitar, by Branford Marsalis on the saxophone, and with Rubén Blades providing additional Spanish vocals.

Song information
Sting explained his song as a symbolic gesture of protest against the Chilean dictator Augusto Pinochet whose regime killed thousands of people between 1973 and 1990. This song was recorded in both English (with some spoken Spanish words by the Panamanian salsa singer, Rubén Blades) and Spanish (with additional lyrics by Roberto Livi). This latter version was titled "Ellas Danzan Solas" and was released on the 1988 EP Nada como el sol.

Cash Box said that the song is "one of Sting's most powerful tunes, a tribute to the Chilean women who stand in mourning and protest for their missing sons and husbands."

Live versions
There are several live versions of this song, most notable from the Nelson Mandela 70th Birthday Tribute (1988), from an Amnesty International concert (1988) in Buenos Aires with Peter Gabriel and the Mothers of the Plaza de Mayo. On October 13, 1990, Sting played the song at Estadio Nacional in Santiago de Chile (with artists including Jackson Browne, Branford Marsalis, Luz Casal, Sinéad O'Connor, Peter Gabriel, Vinnie Colaiuta and New Kids on the Block).

Cover versions
Jose Feliciano and the Vienna Symphonic Orchestra Project (Instrumental Version) (1988) from the album Jose Feliciano and Vienna Symphony Orchestra, Richie Havens (1994) from the album Cuts to the Chase, Bob Belden Ensemble (Instrumental Version) (1989) from the album Straight to My Heart: The Music of Sting, Mark Hall from the album Acoustic Moods of Sting, the London Symphony Orchestra (1994) from the album Performs the Music of Sting, Lynn McDonald (2007) from the album It's High Time, Holly Near & Mercedes Sosa (English/Spanish Version) (1990) from the album Singer in the Storm, Mariano Yanani (2005) from the album Babies go Sting, Joan Baez (Spanish Version) (1989) from the album Diamonds & Rust in the Bullring, and Birgitte Grimstad (Danish version) (1996) from the album Ord over grind, 51 Beste 1966-1994.

Charts

See also
"Mothers of the Disappeared" – a song by U2 that treats the same subject

References

External links
Sting: Lyrics by Sting. The Dial Press. 2007. 
Marjorie Agosín: Tapestries of hope, threads of love: the arpillera movement in Chile. Rowman & Littlefield, 2007. 
Billboard review from the From Chile... An Embrace To Hope concert in Santiago de Chile (Online)

1987 songs
1988 singles
Sting (musician) songs
Spanglish songs
Protest songs
Songs written by Sting (musician)
Music videos directed by Dominic Sena
Songs about dancing